Ultraviolet is the eighth studio album by Finnish alternative rock band Poets of the Fall, released on 5 October 2018 through Insomniac. As stated in interviews, the album is the second part of a trilogy, the first part being their prior album. The album deals with the unseen world, the ultraviolet spectrum of light, which can, at times, be harmful. It’s all that which we are not aware of, but which still affects us and influences us in our daily lives. How we perceive things and how we make choices and act based on those perceptions.

Reception
Reviews from critics have been relatively positive.
Though a bit of a departure from their rock sound and containing more pop elements, the album does still contain rock and also some prog elements that are comparable to the Von Hertzen Brothers, and the band was praised as such by critics. A reviewer from Maximum Volume Music applauded them for "not simply sticking to what was a winning formula and for mixing styles up," while also stating how this would be very dividing for fans from the early days, but how it will also win a few new ones.

Track listing

Notes
 The track "My Dark Disquiet", was featured in the 2019 Remedy Entertainment game Control.

Personnel
Band
 Marko Saaresto - vocals
 Olli Tukiainen - lead guitar
 Jaska Mäkinen - rhythm guitar
 Markus "Captain" Kaarlonen - keyboards, production
 Jani Snellman - bass
 Jari Salminen - drums, percussion

References

2018 albums
Poets of the Fall albums